Joseph Boze (7 February 1746 – 17 January 1826) was a French portrait painter and pastellist mostly active during the ancien régime and the French Revolution.

Biography
Boze was born in Martigues on 7 February 1746, the son of a sailor. He studied painting in Marseille, Nîmes and Montpellier before moving to Paris in 1778. There he became a portrait painter at the court of King Louis XVI, to whom he was possibly introduced to by the Abbé de Vermond, a confidant of Marie-Antoinette at the court. He is believed to have been influenced by Quentin de la Tour.

He exhibited at the Paris Salon for the first time in 1791, where he received negative reviews. Boze initially supported the French Revolution, having joined the Jacobin Club. He painted portraits of numerous leaders of the Revolution, including Robespierre, Marat and Desmoulins, and French military officers such as Lafayette and Berthier. Under the constitutional monarchy he remained loyal to Louis XVI, and in 1792 acted as an intermediary between him and the Girondins.  He was arrested as a counter-revolutionary during the Reign of Terror, but was released in 1794. He signed a petition in 1799 to have the name of fellow painter Élisabeth Vigée Le Brun removed from the list of émigrés.

Little is known about his life during the subsequent Consulate and the Empire, though he was attested to be living in Paris's quartier de la Sorbonne in 1805 and 1811. In 1817 he was granted a pension by King Louis XVIII in the Bourbon Restoration. Boze died in Paris on 17 January 1826.

Gallery

Portraits

References

1746 births
1826 deaths
18th-century French painters
French portrait painters
People from Martigues
Portrait miniaturists
Painters from Paris
Court painters
Pastel artists